A list of French-produced films scheduled for release in 2018.

Films

Notes

External links
 French films of 2018 at the Internet Movie Database
 2018 in France
 2018 in French television

French
2018
Films